Richard Pryor: The Funniest Man Dead or Alive is a 2005 television documentary film aired by the television network BET on the life and influence of Richard Pryor.  The thirty-minute special featured commentary from a wide range of actors, comedians, musicians, politicians, and Pryor's own family members. It aired just nine days after his death.

External links
 

American documentary television films
2005 television films
2005 films
Documentary films about comedy and comedians
Richard Pryor
2000s American films